Nicrophorus hispaniola is a burying beetle described by Sikes and Peck in 2000. It is endemic to the southwestern mountainous Dominican Republic on the island of Hispaniola.

References

Silphidae
Beetles of North America
Insects of the Dominican Republic
Endemic fauna of the Dominican Republic
Beetles described in 2000